Hekou Border Economic Cooperation Zone (HKBECZ) is a Chinese State Council-approved Industrial Park based in Hekou County, Honghe Prefecture, Yunnan, China, founded in 1993 and was established to promote trade between China and Vietnam. Transport links with Ho Chi Minh City and Hanoi, Vietnam include:

 Rail: Yunnan–Vietnam Railway 
 Road: Kunming-Hanoi Highway
 Waterway: Red River (Asia)

Sino-Vietnamese business is growing fast, especially in recent years. In 1999, total foreign trade of Sino-Vietnam businesses amounted to USD 72.21 million while border trade was USD 45.94 million.

Main export products include clothing, cotton yarn, ceresin wax, mechanical equipment, batteries, fruits, rice seeds and tobacco.

The Vietnamese government fully endorses Sino-Vietnam border trade. With effect from 15 January 1999, import and export had been catalogued in accordance with the international tax rate. Also, three kinds of products, namely, rubber, coal and marine, are exported with zero tax rates. Since March 1999, the government has encouraged more trade channels and more types of products for trade.

See also

 Sino-Vietnamese relations
 Kunming Economic and Technology Development Zone
 Kunming High-tech Industrial Development Zone
 Ruili Border Economic Cooperation Zone
 Wanding Border Economic Cooperation Zone

References

 Hekou Border Economic Cooperation Zone - Alibaba Group

Economy of Yunnan
Special Economic Zones of China
Hekou Yao Autonomous County